Separate lists have been created for each letter:
 List of films: E
 List of films: F
 List of films: G
 List of films: H
 List of films: I

-